The Copa Votorantim Sub-15, is the oldest and most traditional Brazilian football competition in the under-15 category. It has been organized by the municipality of Votorantim since 1991.

List of champions

Following there are all the championship editions:

Titles by club

References

Football cup competitions in São Paulo (state)
Youth football competitions in Brazil
Under-15 association football
Recurring sporting events established in 1991